Elizabeth de Mowbray, Duchess of Norfolk (née Talbot;  December 1442/January 1443 – 6 November 1506/10 May 1507) was a daughter of John Talbot, 1st Earl of Shrewsbury and his wife Lady Margaret Beauchamp.

Family
Lady Elizabeth Talbot was a daughter of John Talbot, 1st Earl of Shrewsbury and his wife Lady Margaret Beauchamp. Her older sister was Lady Eleanor Talbot, believed to have been King Edward IV's mistress. Elizabeth's maternal grandparents were Richard de Beauchamp, 13th Earl of Warwick and Elizabeth de Berkeley. One of her brothers was John Talbot, 1st Viscount Lisle, a nobleman and soldier.

Marriage
She was married to John de Mowbray. He succeeded his father as Duke of Norfolk in 1461, making her the Duchess of Norfolk by marriage. They had only one surviving daughter, who inherited the Warwick estates.

 Anne de Mowbray, 8th Countess of Norfolk (10 December 1472 – 1481), married Richard of Shrewsbury, 1st Duke of York, a son of Edward IV of England and one of the Princes in the Tower. Anne died at the age of 8.

Ancestry

References

Works cited

 
 

Elizabeth Talbot
Daughters of British earls
Daughters of Irish earls
Wives of knights
1440s births
1500s deaths
Elizabeth
15th-century births
Date of birth uncertain
Date of death unknown
15th-century English people
15th-century English women
16th-century English women